Shumilovka is a rural locality (a selo) in Voskresenovsky Selsoviet of Mikhaylovsky District, Amur Oblast, Russia. The population was 53 as of 2018. There are 3 streets.

Geography 
Shumilovka is located 51 km northeast of Poyarkovo (the district's administrative centre) by road. Voskresenovka is the nearest rural locality.

References 

Rural localities in Mikhaylovsky District, Amur Oblast